Ahmed Imaz (born 12 April 1992) is a Maldivian footballer nicknamed "Aakko", who is currently playing for Da Grande Sports Club.

Club career
Imaz signed for Club Eagles in 2011 and played three very successful seasons at the club, breaking through to the Maldives U23 and Maldives senior team in the following year.

On 24 December 2014, Imaz signed a one-year deal with Maziya. After one-year he extended his contract with Maziya and stayed until February 2019.

On 09 March 2019, Imaz signed for newly promoted club Da Grande Sports Club

International career
Imaz made his debut in the Maldives' first match of 2012 Nehru Cup, in which they won 2-1 against Nepal on 23 August 2012, coming on to play in the 89th minute, replacing the captain Ali Ashfaq.

Career statistics

International goals

Under–23 

Scores and results list Maldives U–23's goal tally first.

International goals
Scores and results list Maldives' goal tally first.

Honours

Maldives
SAFF Championship: 2018

References

External links

1992 births
Living people
Maldivian footballers
Maldives international footballers
Footballers at the 2014 Asian Games
Association football midfielders
Asian Games competitors for the Maldives
Club Eagles players
Da Grande Sports Club players